Golden Dawn is an Austrian band formed by Stefan Traunmüller, originally as a one-man black metal project, in 1992. It eventually attracted the attention of two influential Austrian metallists, Ray Wells of Pazuzu and Martin Schirenc of Pungent Stench and Hollenthon, which led to a compilation appearance and eventually a recording contract with Dark Matter Records.

Traunmüller recorded his debut album, The Art of Dreaming, while still a one-man band, but with session help from Thomas Tannenberger of Abigor and Martin Schirenc.

Dark Matter soon folded, however. It was not until seven years later that the band, now consisting of four members, recorded its next album, Masquerade, with Napalm Records.

In January 2012, the new album, Return To Provenance, was released on Non Serviam Records.

Members
Stefan Traunmüller - vocals, keyboard
Karim Kienzle - guitar
Sebastian Reiter - guitar, bass
Moritz Neuner - drums

Discography
The Art of Dreaming (1996)
Masquerade (2003)
Return to Provenance (2012)

External links
Golden Dawn at Non Serviam Records
Golden Dawn at Napalm Records
Golden Dawn MySpace

Austrian black metal musical groups
Austrian heavy metal musical groups
Musical groups established in 1992
Musical quartets